Peter Watson (18 March 1935 – July 2016) was an English professional footballer who played as a centre forward in the Football League for Workington.

Career
Born in Newcastle, Watson played for North Shields, Workington and Ashington.

References

1935 births
2016 deaths
Footballers from Newcastle upon Tyne
English footballers
Association football forwards
North Shields F.C. players
Workington A.F.C. players
Ashington A.F.C. players
English Football League players